Chipping Norton is a suburb of Sydney, in the state of New South Wales, Australia. Chipping Norton is 27 kilometres south-west of the Sydney central business district, in the local government area of the City of Liverpool and is part of the Greater Western Sydney region.

History

Aboriginal culture
There are two traditional custodians of the Chipping Norton Lake area – the Tharawal people, which inhabited the southern side of the Georges River, and the Darug people to the north and west of the River.

White settlement
Chipping Norton was a farming area throughout the nineteenth and early twentieth centuries, named after an old English village by William Alexander Long. Long was born in Sydney in 1839, and travelled to England to study law, and later lived in Chipping Norton (Oxfordshire). He bought up a number of former land grants in the area at the turn of the twentieth century and his homestead 'Chipping Norton'. The horse stud on part of his property produced many fine young horses. He died in 1915 and in 1919 the government bought his estate and subdivided it into farming blocks for soldiers returning from the First World War.

Thomas Moore, another prominent early settler, was granted waterfront land that is now part of the park. 'The Homestead' within the reserve grounds was built in the 1880s. Chipping Norton Post Office opened on 1 September 1920 and closed in 1974.

As farming activities declined, the rich topsoil and underlying sand was mined. After 20 years of mining, the riverbanks were packed with dangerous pits and eroded banks. In 1977 the Chipping Norton Lakes Authority was set up to rehabilitate the area into parkland.

Heritage listings 
Chipping Norton has a heritage-listed site:

 Charlton Avenue: The Homestead

Population 
At the 2016 census, Chipping Norton had a population of 9,001 people. The most common ancestries were Australian (17.5%), English (15.1%), Italian (6.7%), Lebanese (6.0%) and Vietnamese (5.7%). 63.1% of people were born in Australia. The next most common countries of birth were Vietnam 4.5%, Lebanon 2.7%, Italy 2.2%, China 1.9% and New Zealand 1.4%. 54.4% of people only spoke English at home, compared to the national average of 72.7%, with other languages including Arabic (9.0%), Vietnamese (6.9%), Greek (5.4%), Italian (3.1%) and Mandarin (2.2%). The most common responses for religion were Catholic 32.6%, No Religion 14.8%, Anglican 12.1% and Eastern Orthodox 10.4%.

Sport and recreation 

Chipping Norton Lake and Lake Moore are the main recreational centres of Chipping Norton. They feature parks, walkways, barbecues and scenery. There are many other parks across the suburb.

Schools 
Chipping Norton has four schools. They are Chipping Norton Public School, Newbridge Heights Public School, Moorebank High School and St Joseph's Catholic School.

References

External links 

 Aus Electronics Direct

Suburbs of Sydney
Hume Highway
City of Liverpool (New South Wales)